HMS Velox was a turbine-powered torpedo boat destroyer (or "TBD") of the British Royal Navy built on speculation in 1901-04 by engineering firm Parsons Marine, with the hull subcontracted to Hawthorn Leslie and Company at Hebburn on the River Tyne. Velox served in the First World War, being sunk by striking a mine in 1915.

Design and construction
The British Admiralty, eager to investigate the use of steam turbines in warships, ordered the experimental destroyer  from Parsons Marine in 1898, and purchased , also turbine-powered, built as a private venture by Armstrong Whitworth, in 1900. Both ships were quickly lost however, with Viper running aground off Alderney on 3 August 1901, and Cobra broke in half while on her delivery voyage on 19 September 1901. The Admiralty was still keen to adopt turbines, and so decided to buy a turbine-powered destroyer that was being built as a private venture by Parsons, the Python.

The hull of Python had been laid down at Hawthorn Leslie and Company's Hebburn, Tyneside shipyard (as for Viper, Parsons had sub-contracted build of the hull to Hawthorn Leslie, with the ship's machinery to be provided by Parsons) on 10 April 1901 and launched on 11 February 1902.

The ship was powered by two sets of compound steam turbines, each consisting of a high-pressure and low-pressure turbine driving a separate propeller shaft, with the high-pressure turbines driving the outer shafts and the low-pressure turbines the inner shafts giving four shafts in all. Two propellers were fitted to each shaft. A new feature was that a pair of small triple expansion engines (rated at  each) that could be coupled to the inner, low-pressure turbine shafts for efficient cruising.

As well as the normal rudder at the ship's stern, a retractable rudder was fitted forward to aid manoeuvrability when running astern. Three funnels were fitted, while the ship's crew consisted of 63 officers and men. Armament was the standard for the thirty-knotters, i.e. a QF 12 pounder 12 cwt ( calibre) gun on a platform on the ship's conning tower (in practice the platform was also used as the ship's bridge), with a secondary armament of five 6-pounder guns, and two 18 inch (450 mm) torpedo tubes.

The Admiralty signed a contract for Python in May 1902, renaming the ship HMS Velox. As experience with earlier destroyers had shown that the speeds achieved in sea trials, which were run lightly loaded, were not representative of speeds in service, it was specified by the Admiralty that trials should instead be carried out fully loaded.

Fuel consumption was significantly higher than expected, however, being up to 80% higher than the normal thirty knotters. Velox was commissioned in February 1902.

Service
Velox was not a success in service, partly due to the very high fuel consumption. Other problems included slow astern speeds (about  only) together with an inability to quickly change the engines to run astern and problems associated with the location of the condensers. The cruising engines were replaced by cruising turbines in 1907.

In May 1909, Velox was passing Lands End when her port engines failed and heavy rolling caused a loss of feedwater supply to her condensers. This almost caused a complete loss of power off a dangerous lee shore. After this incident, Velox was transferred from normal flotilla duty to be attached to HMS Vernon, the Royal Navy's torpedo establishment as a training vessel. As such, Velox would not need to operate in poor weather which could cause a similar failure.

On 30 August 1912 the Admiralty directed all destroyers were to be grouped into classes designated by letters based on contract speed and appearance. As a three-funneled destroyer, Velox  was assigned to the C Class.

Velox remained attached to HMS Vernon on the outbreak of the First World War in August 1914. In January 1915, Velox was assigned to the local patrol flotilla at Portsmouth.

On 25 October 1915, the ship was on patrol with the destroyer  when condenser problems forced Velox to seek calmer waters near the Isle of Wight. Attempts to tow Velox to safety were unsuccessful, and Velox foundered.

Conservation and Recovery Efforts
The site of HMS Velox lies approximately 1.5 miles east of Bembridge on the southern margin of the east The Solent. While much of the wreckage has already been recovered, divers continue to recover artifacts from the site. The Maritime Archaeology Trust began sponsoring recovery and conservation efforts at the site of the Velox in 2010, and continues to sponsor similar efforts at other shipwreck sites of cultural importance.

Pennant numbers

References

Notes

Citations

Bibliography
 
 
 
 
 
 
 
 
 
 
 
 
 

 

Ships built on the River Tyne
1902 ships
C-class destroyers (1913)
World War I destroyers of the United Kingdom
Maritime incidents in 1915
Ships sunk by mines
World War I shipwrecks in the English Channel